Wehrwirtschaftsführer (WeWiFü) were, during the time of Nazi Germany (1933–1945), executives of companies or big factories called rüstungswichtiger Betrieb (company important for the production of war materials). Wehrwirtschaftsführer were appointed, starting 1935, by the Wehrwirtschafts und Rüstungsamt (department for implementing the policy of directing the nation's economic activity towards preparation for and support of the war effort, including armaments) being a part of the Oberkommando der Wehrmacht, that was pushing the build-up of arms for the Wehrmacht. The purpose of the appointment was to bind them to the Wehrmacht and to give them a quasi-military status.

After 1938, the  appointed the Wehrwirtschaftsführer. From 1940 on, this title was given more and more also to leading employees in companies not belonging to the armament branch, also to demonstrate that those companies were contributing to the wartime economy.

Especially before 1940, appointments did not indicate the political attitude of the person receiving the title. They also gave no information saying that their company was important for the armament.

If a manager was appointed Wehrwirtschaftsführer, their company could more easily use negative employment laws for the workers and employees.

Appointees
 
 Gustav Böhme, owner of Dr. Ing. Böhme & Co., Metallwarenfabrik, Minden-Lübbeckerstrasse
 , chief executive officer and general director of the  coal mining company
 Carl Friedrich Wilhelm Borgward
 William Borm
 Carl Bosch
 Max Brose
 Richard Bruhn (Auto Union)
 Heinrich Bütefisch (I.G. Farben)
 
 
 Claude Dornier
 Gerhard Fieseler
 Friedrich Flick
 Edmund Geilenberg
 Berthold Geipel, founder of Erfurter Maschinenfabrik (ERMA)
 Alfred Freiherr von Harder
 Ernst Heinkel
 Jost Henkel
 Paul Henrichs (Carl Zeiss, Jena)
 
 
 
 Hans Kohnert
 August Kotthaus (Carl Zeiss, Jena)
 Carl Krauch
 Alfried Krupp von Bohlen und Halbach
 Gustav Krupp von Bohlen und Halbach
 Heinz Küppenbender (Carl Zeiss, Jena)
 Friedrich Linde, of Linde plc
 
 Wilhelm Emil Messerschmitt
 
 Heinrich Nordhoff
 
 
 Ernst Poensgen
 Ferdinand Porsche
 Günther Quandt
 
 
 
 Hermann Röchling
 Willy Sachs
 
 Philipp Alois von Schoeller
 
 
 Kurt Tank
 
 
 
 
 Ludger Westrick
  (Siemens)

Wehrwirtschaftsführer after the war 
After the end of the war, most military leaders were punished by the Allies, but were soon reinstated in key posts of reconstruction under Cold War conditions. Symptomatic of this was the return to power of Friedrich Flick, the greatest business leader of the Third Reich and the most prominent leader of the military economy. After seven years of captivity, he again became the greatest entrepreneur of the Federal Republic, awarded the Grand Cross of Merit with shoulder strap and star.

Literature 
 Paul Erker: Industrieeliten in der NS-Zeit: Anpassungsbereitschaft und Eigeninteresse von Unternehmen in der Rüstungs- und Kriegswirtschaft, 1936 - 1945. Passau: Wissenschaftsverlag Rothe, 1993, 120 p.
 Kurt Pritzkoleit: Gott erhält die Mächtigen - Rück- und Rundblick auf den deutschen Wohlstand. Düsseldorf: Karl Rauch Verlag, S. 430, pp. 95 -123 (comprehensive list of World War II "Wehrwirtschaftsführer" and their role in German economy and politics which was firmly established again after the war).

References 

Economy of Nazi Germany